Kateh-ye Basht (also Romanized as Kateh-ye Bāsht and Kateh Bāsht; also known as Kateh, Katteh, and Sādāt-e Anā) is a village in Babuyi Rural District, Basht District, Basht County, Kohgiluyeh and Boyer-Ahmad Province, Iran. At the 2006 census, its population was 370, in 71 families.

References 

Populated places in Basht County